Sekolah Berasrama Penuh Integrasi Tun Abdul Razak (abbreviated InSTAR)  is one of the 67 boarding schools (SBP) in Malaysia. The school is located in Pulau Serai, Pekan, Pahang. In 2009, the school has 197 boys and 228 girls, making a total enrolment of 425 people. It has a total of 58 teachers.

Generality of these school sites is 38 acres located in the state assembly Peramu Jaya, Pekan Parliament, about 15 km from the city town and 35 km from Kuantan.

History
InSTAR was opened on 4 August 2003 under the name of Sekolah Berasrama Penuh Integrasi Pekan (SBPIP) only occupied by students from Form One, taken from schools around Pahang who are eligible to enter SBPIP. The first form four students intake was started in 2004.

On 23 May 2010, the name of Sekolah Berasrama Penuh Integrasi Pekan  has been officially changed to Sekolah Berasrama Penuh Integrasi Tun Abdul Razak with abbreviation of InSTAR (Integrated Residential School of Tun Abdul Razak). Since then instar continues to grow and now has reached maximum enrolment capacity of 560 students, 62 teachers and 20 supporting staff.

Academic System 
Just like other Sekolah Berasrama Penuh Integrasi in Malaysia, InSTAR  requires lower secondary students to take nine (9) subject for Penilaian Menengah Rendah (PMR) including communication Arabic subject.
For higher secondary students, they offered to continue learning in a stream that is offered for Sijil Pelajaran Malaysia (SPM)  as follows:

1. Pure Science
offers nine subjects for the SPM, which are Malay language, English, History, Mathematics, Additional Mathematics, Biology, Physics, Chemistry, Islamic Religious Education.

2. Religious Pure Science
offers 11 subjects for SPM, which are Malay language, English, History, Mathematics, Additional Mathematics, Biology, Physics, Chemistry, High Arabic language, Quran and Sunnah Education and Educational of Islamic Sharia.

3. Technical Science
offers 10 subjects for SPM, which are Malay language, English, History, Mathematics, Additional Mathematics, Physics, Chemistry, Engineering and Technical Drawing.

International language education was introduced in the school such as Arabic, French and Mandarin. The school is also involved in the BCCC program, one of the school internationalisation program.

List of Principals 
Since operating on 4 August 2003, InSTAR were led by four principals as follows:

Logo

Achievement
 16 February 2011: Deputy Prime Minister and also an Education Minister, Muhyiddin Yassin today announced instar as the High Performance Schools (HPS).

References

External links 
 Persatuan Alumni SBP Integrasi Tun Abdul Razak (Instarex)

Educational institutions established in 2003
2003 establishments in Malaysia
Co-educational boarding schools
Islamic schools in Malaysia